"Lazarus" is a single by British progressive rock band Porcupine Tree, released in March 2005 in Poland and Germany only. It contains a radio edit of the title track plus two songs that were later added on the DVD audio version (Half-Light) and the vinyl edition (both songs) of Deadwing. It was accompanied by a music video directed by Danish longtime collaborator Lasse Hoile, and charted in Germany at #91.

Track listing

Personnel
Porcupine Tree
Steven Wilson – vocals, guitars, piano, keyboards, bass on "Lazarus"
Richard Barbieri – keyboards and synthesizers
Colin Edwin – bass
Gavin Harrison – drums

Additional personnel
Mikael Åkerfeldt – backing vocals on "Lazarus"

Chart position

References

2000s ballads
2005 singles
Atlantic Records singles
Porcupine Tree songs
Rock ballads
Songs written by Steven Wilson